Sidney Perley (1858–1928) was a lawyer, writer, poet, author, editor, and historian.

Biography

Sidney Perley, son of Humphrey and Eunice Perley, was born in Boxford, Massachusetts on March 6, 1858.

He acquired his early education within the public schools of his native town and by private study. He was educated for the profession of law at Boston University School of Law, graduating with the degree of LL. B. in 1886. On July 20, 1880, he was admitted to practice in the courts of Boston. That following September, he began his professional career in Salem.

For more than twenty years, Perley was a familiar figure in court and professional circles within Essex County. He was known as a capable, conscientious, and successful lawyer – one whose policy was to discourage rather than promote litigation. His practice inclined strongly to the civil side of the courts and his clientage were a number of large corporations, both financial and industrial. As a lawyer, his methods were careful and methodical, and in his intercourse with clients, mature deliberation always preceded counsel.

Aside from the exactions of a large practice, Perley found time to indulge his native literary taste in various directions, and as a writer, he was clear, forcible, and versatile – the gamut of his efforts including works on subjects of law, history, genealogy, and poetry.

Almost since boyhood, he delved into history and genealogy. The preface of his History of Boxford bears the date of his twenty-first birthday. During the last fifteen years devoting leisure hours to his work, he has searched the Salem records in quest of the original houselots, thoroughfares, and water boundaries. He was also interested in ancient court files and records of deeds and/or wills of materials for the ample and accurate genealogies, which are published in the Essex Antiquarian, of which he is editor and one of the founders. A quarterly magazine devoted to genealogy, biography, history, and antiquities of Essex County, is now in its twelfth year and the survivor of nearly all publications of the same general character.

He has been editor and collaborator in several other large works in which his name does not appear on the title page, as well as pamphlets and monographs. Since 1877, Perley has been a member of the New England Historic Genealogical Society, and also was a member of the Essex Institute, and various other professional and literary organizations. In political preference, he was a Republican, and supported prohibition.

At one time he was regarded as the leading man of the prohibition party in Essex County, and stood as its candidate for the office of attorney-general of Massachusetts, member of the governor's council, clerk of courts and Senator. Locally, he has been the no-license candidate for the mayoralty and also for membership in the board of aldermen.

From 1881 to 1886, he was town auditor of Boxford. From 1900 to 1903, he was also a member of the school committee of the city of Salem.

On June 11, 1889, Sidney Perley married Harriet Hood Spofford, who was born in Georgetown, December 10, 1861, daughter of George Milton and Sarah Peabody (Hood) Spofford. They had two children: Eleanor Spofford, October 9, 1894, and Richard Hood, October 17, 1898.

Sidney Perley died in Boston on June 9, 1928, soon after the publication of his 3 volume History Of Salem, Massachusetts.

Works
Perley, Sidney. History of Boxford, Essex County, Massachusetts. Full images at books.google.Published 1880.
Perley, Sidney. Historic Storms of New England: Its Gales, Hurricanes, Tornadoes, Etc. Published 1891.
Perley, Sidney. Mortuary Law. Published by George B. Reed, Law Publisher 1896.
Perley, Sidney. Poets of Essex County Massachusetts. Published 1889.
Perley, Sidney. Essex Antiquarian,Volume 1, 1897.
Perley, Sidney. Essex Antiquarian,Volume 3, 1899. Full images at books.google.
Perley, Sidney. Essex Antiquarian, Volume 8, 1909.
Perley, Sidney. N.E.Historical Genealogical Register. Volume 62,1908.page 51, Obituary of Alfred Poore 1818-1907.
Perley, Sidney. The Indian Land Titles of Essex County, Massachusetts. Published 1912.
Perley, Sidney. History of Salem, Massachusetts in Three Volumes. Full images at University of Virginia eText Center and the Salem Witch Trial Documentary Archive and Transcription Project.

References

Cutter, William Richard. Genealogical and Personal Memoirs Relating to the Families of Boston Volume 2, page 1065, Sidney Perley. Published by the Lewis Historical Publishing Company, 1908.

External links
 The Essex Antiquarian, Volumes 1 - 13, Hathi Trust

Massachusetts lawyers
Poets from Massachusetts
American magazine founders
People from Boxford, Massachusetts
1858 births
1928 deaths
19th-century American lawyers